Sidraílson da Mata Ribeiro (born 26 February 1982 in João Alfredo, Pernambuco), commonly known as simply Sidraílson, is a Brazilian football player who currently plays for Juazeirense.

He plays as a defender and joined Hong Kong First Division champions South China before the 2007-08 season. He played for the team in Barclays Asia Trophy 2007 and made his league debut on 2 September 2007 against Kitchee.

Career statistics in Hong Kong

Sidraílson played as central defender since joined South China in 2007. His reliable performance made him became one of the most famous name in the squad.

Honours
South China AA
Hong Kong First Division League: 3
 2007–08, 2008–09, 2009–10

Hong Kong Senior Challenge Shield: 1
 2009–10

External links
 Player Information on Scaafc.com
 Sidraílson at HKFA
 Profile at Portuguese Liga 
Brazilian FA Database 

1982 births
Living people
Brazilian footballers
Brazilian expatriate footballers
Association football defenders
Primeira Liga players
Hong Kong First Division League players
Expatriate footballers in Hong Kong
South China AA players
Esporte Clube Santo André players
Sportspeople from Pernambuco
Brazilian expatriate sportspeople in Hong Kong
Sociedade Desportiva Juazeirense players
Hong Kong League XI representative players